Christina Bohannan (born July 2, 1971) is an American politician, law professor, and former engineer who served as the Iowa State Representative for the 85th district from 2021 to 2023. Elected in 2020, she succeeded Vicki Lensing. Bohannan was the Democratic nominee for  Iowa's 1st congressional district in 2022, losing to incumbent Republican Mariannette Miller-Meeks.

Early life and education 
Bohannan was born in 1971 and was raised in Florida. She earned a Bachelor of Science degree in environmental engineering from the University of Florida and a Juris Doctor from the Fredric G. Levin College of Law.

Career 
Bohannan began her career as an environmental engineer for the Florida Department of Environmental Protection in the 1990s. She moved to Iowa in 2000, where she became a professor of law at the University of Iowa College of Law. While teaching at the University of Iowa, Bohannan served as president of the faculty senate.

Bohannan began her campaign for the 85th district seat of the Iowa House of Representatives in October 2019. She defeated incumbent legislator Vicki Lensing by 32 points in the primary and won the general election uncontested.

Bohannan ran for the United States House of Representatives in Iowa's 2nd congressional district in 2022 elections. She was the Democratic nominee but lost in the general election to incumbent Republican Mariannette Miller-Meeks.

References

External links 

Representative Christina Bohannan official legislative website

1971 births
20th-century American engineers
20th-century women engineers
21st-century American politicians
21st-century American women politicians
American women academics
American women engineers
Candidates in the 2022 United States House of Representatives elections
Fredric G. Levin College of Law alumni
Engineers from Florida
Environmental engineers
Iowa lawyers
Living people
Democratic Party members of the Iowa House of Representatives
University of Iowa College of Law faculty
American women legal scholars
American legal scholars
Women state legislators in Iowa
20th-century American women